3 Hati Dua Dunia Satu Cinta is a 2010 Indonesian drama film directed by Benni Setiawan. The film won seven awards at the Indonesian Film Festival in 2011, including Best Film. The film is adapted from two novels by Ben Sohib (Da Peci Code and Rosid dan Delia). The film deals with how a young Muslim man, Roshid (Reza Rahardian) and a Catholic girl (Laura Basuki) are able to deal with religious differences.

Accolades

References

External links 
 

Citra Award winners
2010s Indonesian-language films
2010 films
2010 drama films
Indonesian drama films
Interfaith romance films